The Nesebar Archaeological Museum (Arheologicheski muzey Nesebar) is a museum located in Nesebar, a town on the Black Sea coast of southeast Bulgaria.

Description

The Nesebar Archaeological museum is founded in 1956 and its first home was the Church of Saint John the Baptist, Nesebar.

In 1994 the museum was hosted in a new building, designed by architect Hristo Koev. The museum  exposition contains cultural monuments from different ages of the history of Nesebar.

References
Museum Ancient Nesebar (Official site)

Archaeological museums in Bulgaria
Nesebar
1956 establishments in Bulgaria
Museums established in 1956
Museums in Burgas Province